Jean Proess (29 April 1896 – 8 June 1978) was a Luxembourgian sprinter. He competed in the men's 400 metres at the 1920 Summer Olympics.

References

1896 births
1978 deaths
Athletes (track and field) at the 1920 Summer Olympics
Luxembourgian male sprinters
Luxembourgian male middle-distance runners
Olympic athletes of Luxembourg
Place of birth missing